Rodman's Gourmet Grocer is a Washington, D.C. institution. The area's original discounter of nationally branded products, family-owned and operated since 1955. Rodman's has been anointed by the Washington Post as the "Weirdest Little Drugstore In Washington".

Originally opened in 1955 and located at 5124 Wisconsin Ave., Rodman's was forced to move in late 1968 as the WMATA began construction on the Red Line of the D.C. metro system.  The Friendship Heights Metro station was to be built adjacent to the store, and WMATA estimated that Rodman's would have to close its doors for up to three years during construction.  Rodman's relocated to 5100 Wisconsin Ave., just a few hundred yards south, where they reside today.

Though a small store with only three locations in the D.C. metropolitan area, Rodman's consistently ranks among the top specialty grocers in the area.  Recent accolades have awarded Rodman's a spot in the top craft and international beer selection, top gourmet grocers, and even top 10 places in D.C. to buy perfume.

References

External links

Privately held companies based in Washington, D.C.
Retail companies based in Washington, D.C.